Gwayasdums is a village of the Kwakwaka'wakw peoples on the west side of Gilford Island in the Johnstone Strait region of the Central Coast of British Columbia, Canada.  The village, located on Retreat Pass, is on Gwayasdums Indian Reserve No. 1.  Other spellings of the name are Kwaustums and gwa'yasdams and Gwa'yasdams and Gwa’yasdams.

History
Gwayasdums, which today has about 70 residents, is the ancestral home of the Kwikwasut’inuxw, though it has been used by many other Kwakwaka'wakw groups over time.  The village was destroyed by the Nuxalk in 1856, possibly in relation to a famine at Bella Coola resulting from the closing of Fort McLoughlin.  The survivors joined the Mamalilikulla at Memkumlis on Village Island. The Gwawa’enuxw, the Haxwa’mis, and the Dzawada’enuxw began to use Gwayasdums as a joint winter village Between 1865 and 1879. In the 1890s the Kwikwasut'inuxw began to return though joint occupation and use continued into the 20th Century.

See also
List of Kwakwaka'wakw villages

References

External links
Hith Alis Lax Gwa-yas-dums: Moving for Crisis to Hope at Gwa-yas-dums Village, report prepared for the KHFN by Bob Chamberlin, William Trousdale, and Jeff Cook, Plan Canada, Summer 2008
Kwikwasut'inuxw Haxwa'mis First Nation website

Kwakwaka'wakw villages
Central Coast of British Columbia
Indigenous conflicts in Canada